Pneumocephalus is the presence of air or gas within the cranial cavity. It is usually associated with disruption of the skull: after head and facial trauma, tumors of the skull base, after neurosurgery or otorhinolaryngology, and rarely, spontaneously. Pneumocephalus can occur in scuba diving, but is very rare in this context.

If there is a valve mechanism which allows air to enter the skull but prevents it from escaping, a tension pneumocephalus can occur (similar to what can happen in a tension pneumothorax).

CT scans of patients with a tension pneumocephalus typically show air that compresses the frontal lobes of the brain, which results in a tented appearance of the brain in the skull known as the Mount Fuji sign.
The name is derived from the resemblance of the brain to Mount Fuji in Japan, a volcano known for its symmetrical cone. In typical cases, there is a symmetrical depression near the midline (such as the crater of a volcano), due to intact bridging veins. Its occurrence seems to be limited to tension pneumocephalus (not occurring in pneumocephalus without tension). The sign was first described by a team of Japanese neurosurgeons.

Pneumocephalus has also been shown to follow neurosurgical procedures such as deep brain stimulation and hematoma evacuation (e.g., chronic subdural hematoma), where while seemingly innocuous to the patient, may cause brain shift, subsequent stereotactic inaccuracy, and even another surgical intervention. Regarding chronic subdural hematoma (CSDH) surgery, a postoperative volume of pneumocephalus greater than 15mL puts a patient at increased risk of CSDH recurrence; in fact, for every milliliter of air entering the cranial cavity after CSDH evacuation, the recurrence risk increases by 4%. Efforts are made by neurosurgeons to reduce pneumocephalus volume during surgery, and thus, subsequent brain shift.

Additional images

Footnotes

External links 

Neurological disorders